Vorobyevka is a rural locality (a village) in Paustovskoye Rural Settlement, Vyaznikovsky District, Vladimir Oblast, Russia. The population was 310 as of 2010. There are 3 streets.

Geography 
Vorobyevka is located 15 km south of Vyazniki (the district's administrative centre) by road. Krutye is the nearest rural locality.

References 

Rural localities in Vyaznikovsky District